The General History of Africa (GHA) is a two-phase project launched by UNESCO in 1964. The 1964 General Conference of UNESCO, during its 13th Session, instructed the Organization to undertake this initiative after the newly independent African Member States expressed a strong desire to reclaim their cultural identity, to rectify widespread ignorance about their Continent's history, and to break free of discriminatory prejudices. Phase One, which began in 1964 and was completed in 1999, consisted of writing and publishing eight volumes which highlight the shared heritage of the peoples of Africa. Phase Two, which began in 2009, focuses on the elaboration of history curricula and pedagogical materials for primary and secondary schools on the basis of the eight volumes of the GHA. Phase Two also focuses on the promotion of the use and harmonization of the teaching of this collection in higher education institutions throughout the Continent. Phase Two also concerns the implementation of these materials in schools in Africa and the diaspora. The objective of both Phase One and Phase Two of the project is to re-appropriate the interpretation and writing of African histories and to demonstrate the contribution of African cultures past and present to the history of humanity at large.

Volumes and contributors

Volume 1: Methodology and African Historiography (1981)

Volume 2: Ancient Civilizations of Africa (1981)

Volume 3: Africa from the Seventh to the Eleventh Century (1988)

Volume 4: Africa from the Twelfth to the Sixteenth Century (1984)

Volume 5: Africa from the Sixteenth to the Eighteenth Century (1992)

Volume 6: Africa from the Nineteenth century until the 1880s (1989)

Volume 7: Africa under colonial domination, 1880-1935 (1985)

Volume 8: Africa since 1935 (1993)

Volume 9 (to be published)
A future ninth volume is planned which will "update the knowledge of previous volumes [...] in the light of new developments in research".

This volume will be made up of four sections:
 Section 1 – Will explore the "epistemological, methodological and theoretical foundations of writing on the history of Africa and people of African descent in the twenty-first century".
 Section 2 – Reviewing content from the first eight volumes.
 Section 3 – Updating of early history of Africa.
 Section 4 – New developments in historical studies over the past two thousand years.

Volume 10 (to be published)
This volume will include "critical observation of the dynamics of the relationship between Africa and its diasporas, the movements between Africa and the rest of the world, and the ways in which Africa connects with the rest of the world".

 Section 1 – The historical contexts in which the concept of Race emerged and how Africans and African-descended people perceive themselves and others.
 Section 2 – Mapping of the African diaspora and how cultural identities have been recreated in the diaspora.
 Section 3 – Biographies of Africans.

Volume 11 (to be published)
This volume will "[address] contemporary challenges for Africa and its diasporas around the world".

 Section 1 – Exploring the concept of "Global Africa".
 Section 2 – The current situation of "gloablized Africans" on the continent and beyond the continent.
 Section 3 – How Africa is "participating in the challenges of the contemporary world".

History

"My own background, the experience I gained as a teacher and as chairman... taught me how necessary it was for the education of young people and for the information of the public at large to have a history book produced by scholars with inside knowledge of the problems and hopes of Africa and with the ability to apprehend the Continent in its entirety."
 - Amadou Mahtar M'Bow, former Director General of UNESCO (1974-1987)

The project encompasses two of UNESCO's key priorities - Africa and Education. Africa, in terms of a response to urgent development needs at the national level and to accompany the regional integration process; and education because this issue is a fundamental human right and the very basis of development and responsible citizenry. African peoples expressed their desire to “decolonize” the history of their Continent in order to deconstruct the traditional prejudices and clarify the truth of the African past. The project also takes into consideration modern teaching tools, such as internet resources and multimedia platforms, to ensure that learning is an interactive discovery process. Africa was never cut off from the rest of the world, and benefitted from mutual exchange and influences with Asia, the Middle East, Europe, and the Americas. The slave trade, slavery, and colonization had a considerable impact on the fragmentation of the Continent. The African Diaspora that resulted contributed in a significant manner to the creation of new cultures and societies. The Pedagogical Use of the General History of Africa aims to develop curriculum that highlights the African contribution to the progress of Humanity, African shared values, interaction with the rest of the world.

In this perspective, the creation of the African Union (AU) and the implementation of the NEPAD philosophy of developing Africa-led solutions to African challenges offered a new and favorable context for a political leadership committed to African regional integration and provided a mechanism for addressing history teaching within the continent as a whole.  Furthermore, the Action Plan of the Second Decade for Education in Africa (2006 to 2015), which emphasizes the strengthening of the links between education and culture and improving the quality of pedagogical content, constitutes an ideal framework for the implementation of the project.

Article 7 of the Charter of African Cultural Renaissance adopted in 2006 in Khartoum at the Heads of State Summit stipulates that:
 
“African States commit themselves to work for African Renaissance. They agree on the need for reconstruction of the historical memory and conscience of Africa and the African Diaspora. They consider that the general History published by UNESCO constitutes a valid base for teaching the History of Africa and recommend its dissemination, including in African languages, as well as the publication of its abridged and simplified versions for wider audiences.”

Phase One
(1964–1999) Following their decolonization in the early 1960s, African countries expressed a strong desire to recover their ownership of their past and the production of knowledge regarding their heritage. The African member states of UNESCO were then called upon to re-affirm their cultural identities and reinforce the common aspiration to achieve African unity. Part of these efforts included combating certain preconceptions including the assumption that the lack of written sources made it difficult to engage in serious study or production of African history. The conventional reading of history also needed to be challenged in order to depict a more accurate picture of the African continent, of its cultural diversity, and its contribution to the general progress of humankind. Thus, at its 16th Session (1964), the General Conference of UNESCO invited the Director-General to undertake the elaboration of a General History of Africa. In this framework, the General History of Africa was written and published in eight volumes, with a main edition in English, French and Arabic. Additional publications have been produced in Chinese, Portuguese, Russian, German, Italian, Spanish, and Japanese. Furthermore, twelve studies and documents on related themes as well as an abridged version of the main edition in English, French, Kiswahili, Hausa and Fulfulde were published. This tremendous undertaking represented thirty five years of cooperation between three hundred and fifty experts from Africa and from the rest of the world.  This work involved some of the most eminent African scholars such as Cheikh Anta Diop, Joseph Ki-Zerbo, Theophile Obenga, Ali Mazrui, Gamal Mokhtar, Bethwell A. Ogot, etc. It also included non-African experts, such as Jan Vansina,  and Philip Curtin.

The main preoccupation of Phase 1 was to provide a culturally relevant perspective based on an interdisciplinary approach with a focus on the history of ideas and civilizations, societies and institutions. To that end, it was envisaged to develop an African centered point of view using African sources, such as oral traditions, art forms and linguistics. It was decided as well to adopt a continental perspective of Africa as a whole avoiding the usual dichotomy between North Africa and Sub-Saharan Africa. This shift in perspective is reflected by the significant number of renowned African scholars who contributed to this project as members of the International Scientific Committee, editors and authors.

To tackle this task, made all the more complex and difficult by the vast range of sources and the fact that documents were widely scattered, UNESCO had to proceed in stages. The first stages (1965 to 1969) consisted of gathering documentation and planning the work. Several meetings were held and campaigns were conducted in the field to collect oral traditions and establish regional documentation centers. In addition, several activities were undertaken: including the collection of unpublished manuscripts in Arabic and Ajami (manuscripts in African languages written with Arabic alphabet), the compilation of archival inventories and the preparation of a Guide to the Sources of the History of Africa, culled from the archives and libraries of a number of European and Asian countries and later published in nine volumes.

The second stage (1969 to 1971) was devoted to the deliberation of complex substantial and methodological questions raised by the compilation of the GHA. It was decided that the GHA should cover three million years of African history, in eight volumes, published in English, Arabic, French, and in African languages such as Kiswahili, Hausa, and Fulfulde.

The next stage (1971 to 1999) consisted of the drafting and publication. This began with the establishment of the International Scientific Committee to ensure the intellectual and scientific responsibility of the work and oversee the drafting and publication of the volumes. During this period, UNESCO organized scientific colloquia and symposia on topics related to the history of Africa most of which were overlooked by researchers. The results of these meetings were published in a series of books entitled “UNESCO Studies and Documents -The General History of Africa”. Twelve studies were published covering a wide range of subjects including: the Slave trade, relations between Africa and the Arab world, relations between Africa and the Indian Ocean, and the role of youth and women.

Bearing in mind that history teaching is instrumental in shaping peoples’ identities and in understanding the common ties underlying the cultural diversity in any region, and in order to implement one of the goals initially set for the General History of Africa by its initiators, UNESCO, in collaboration with the African Union Commission, launched in March 2009,  Phase II of GHA entitled the “Pedagogical Use of the General History of Africa” project.

Phase Two
In 2009 UNESCO launched the second phase of the project focusing on the implementation of the GHA entitled, the “Pedagogical Use of the General History of Africa.” This phase, which constitutes a priority in the cooperation between UNESCO and the African Union, falls within the framework of the Action Plan of the Second Decade for Education in Africa (2006–2015). The Action Plan emphasizes the strengthening of the links between education and culture and improving the quality of pedagogical contents such as internet resources and audiovisual materials. It further corresponds to recommendations made following several meetings organized by UNESCO before and after the completion of the first phase of the GHA.

In order to successfully implement the second phase of the project, UNESCO has had to have the project validated by different African institutional and academic stakeholders including the Ministers of Education and various professional associations including historians, history teachers, pedagogues, et al. At the Ministers of Education of the COMEDAF meeting in November 2009, the African Ministers reaffirmed their support for the project and recalled the political leadership of the African Union on the Project. This continued cooperation between the Commission of the African Union and UNESCO has been necessary to facilitate the appropriation of the project.

Objectives:
“This project gives us a formidable opportunity to develop a pan-African vision that also highlights the contribution of African cultures and civilizations to humankind.” 
 - Irina Bokova, Director General of UNESCO June 16, 2010

The main objective of Phase Two, entitled "The Pedagogical Use of the General History of Africa" is to contribute to the regenerating of the teaching of African history on the basis of the General History of Africa in African Union member States with the view to promote the African regional integration process. In particular, the project aims to:
 develop common content for use in African primary and secondary schools, for three different age groups (under 12, 13-16 and 17-19) as well as an historical atlas and an educational CD-Rom. The content could, if necessary, be adapted to local circumstances without changing the regional scope;
 improve teacher training in light of the latest findings in historical research and advances made in the methodology and methods of history teaching. A teachers’ guide will be elaborated and guidelines to reinforce initial and in-service training of primary and secondary school teachers will be defined.
 promote the teaching of and harmonize the use of the GHA in higher education institutions across the continent.

Implementation:
To implement the project, UNESCO established a ten-member Scientific Committee (SC) representing the five sub regions of the Continent, entrusted with the intellectual and scientific responsibility of the project. The committee members were designated by the Director General of UNESCO in February 2009 after a series of consultations held with different partners and stakeholders including: the African Union, the Africa Group of UNESCO, the donor country, the African Historian Association, the International Association of Historians, and members of the former International Scientific Committee established for the first phase of the Project. These members are:
Professor Alaa El-din Shaheen (Egypt), Professor Taieb El Bahloul (Libyan Arab Jamahiriya), Professor Sifiso Ndlovu (South Africa), Professor Amakobe Florida Karani (Kenya), Professor Adame Ba Konaré (Mali), Professor Jean Michel Mabeko-Tali (Congo), Professor Lily Mafela (Botswana), Professor Elikia M’bokolo (D.R. Congo), Professor Mamadou N’doye (Senegal), Professor Bahru Zewde (Ethiopia).

The aforementioned members were installed on February 24, 2009 in the framework of the Forum for African Regional and Sub-Regional Organizations to Support Cooperation between UNESCO and NEPAD (FORASUN) that took place in Tripoli (Libya) from February 20–24, 2009, UNESCO organized an Expert Meeting on March 16–17, 2009  to discuss the proposed methodology for the implementation of the project. This meeting was immediately followed by the first meeting of the Scientific Committee (SC), which took place from March 18–20, 2009.

Major developments since the launch of Phase Two:

1. Organization of an expert meeting:
UNESCO organized on March 16–17, 2009 an Expert Meeting which gathered 35 experts from the different African sub regions, including members of the former International Scientific Committee for the first Phase of the GHA, editors and authors of the GHA volumes, representatives of African sub regional organizations et al. During the meeting, the experts discussed the proposed methodology for the implementation of the project and made concrete recommendations to the SC.

2. Organization of the 1st meeting of the SC:
The SC for the Pedagogical Use of the General History of Africa held its First Meeting from March 18–20, 2009 at UNESCO HQ.[7] The Committee:
 Elected its Bureau (Prof. Mbokolo, Chairman; Prof. N’doye, 1st Vice-Chairman; Prof. El Bahloul, 2nd Vice-Chairman; Prof. Mafela, Rapporteur)
 Determined the functioning of the Committee
 Discussed the methodology and activities proposed for the implementation of the project
 Examined the recommendations formulated to that end by the Experts Meeting
 Stressed the need to make the most of any relevant political and cultural events to present the Project and to advocate for it
3. Endorsement by the Executive Council of the African Union (AU)
 During its Sixth Ordinary Session held in Khartoum, on 24–25 January 2006, the African Union Heads of States took a decision regarding the strengthening of the links between education and culture (Assembly/AU/dec.96 (VI)), as one of the main focus areas of the Plan of Action for the Second Decade of Education for Africa (2006-2015)

 During its Fifteenth Ordinary Session held in Syrte (Libya) from 24 to 30 June 2009, the Council adopted a decision in which it expressed its support for the project and urged the African Union Member States to contribute to its implementation (Decision EX.CL/Dec. 492 (XV) Rev.1).

4.	Endorsement by the Conference of Ministers of Education of the African Union (COMEDAF)
 During their Second Extraordinary Session (COMEDAF II+), which took place from 4 to 8 September 2006 in Maputo (Mozambique), the African Ministers of Education pointed out in their Declaration the teaching of African history as one of the issues critical to successfully eradicate deficiencies in Africa's Education systems and to ensure that education plays its role in the vision of the African Union and this, within the Second Decade of Education for Africa.
 During their Fourth Ordinary Session (COMEDAF IV) held in Mombasa (Kenya), 23–26 November 2009, the African Ministers, in their communiqué, reaffirmed their support for the project and recalled the political leadership of the African Union on the project.
5. Designation of focal points within the African Ministers of Education (MoE):
46 African Ministers of Education out of 51 have designated focal points within their ministries to participate in and follow up the implementation of the project.

6. Designation of the drafting committees for the elaboration of pedagogical tools on the basis of the GHA:
The SC for the project met from  24 to 28 October 2010 to designate members of the drafting committees  for the common pedagogical content and teachers guides. The Committee selected 30 experts who will compose the above-mentioned committees taking into account competency, gender, and geographical balance.

Conflicting views between historians
Due to the nature of the series, different historians had contrasting and conflicting views on certain subject matters.

Cheikh Anta Diop's "Origin of the ancient Egyptians" chapter
Cheikh Anta Diop's contribution to the second volume focused on the ancient Egyptian race controversy and his argument that "the whole of the [ancient] Egyptian population [...] was negro, barring an infiltration of white nomads in the proto-dynastic epoch", and that "the  black  population of  Upper Egypt  began  to  retreat only  at  the  time of  the  Persian occupation". This argument was not universally accepted by the other contributors to the UNESCO series. Diop's chapter had a note from editor Gamal Mokhtar warning the reader that "The  opinions  expressed  by Professor  Cheikh  Anta Diop  in this chapter are those  which  he  presented  and  developed  at the Unesco  symposium on 'The  peopling  of ancient Egypt' [...] The arguments  put  forward  in this chapter have not  been  accepted by all  the  experts  interested in the  problem." In the introduction to the volume, Mokhtar himself argued that "it  is  highly  doubtful  whether  the  inhabitants  that  introduced  civilization into the Nile  valley ever belonged to one single, pure race". However, Mokhtar later added in the introduction that “It is more than probable that the African strain, black or light, is preponderant in the Ancient Egyptian, but in the present state of our knowledge it is impossible to say more”.  Diop's chapter was followed by a summary of the 1974 Cairo symposium where Diop presented his ideas to 19 other historians.

The reactions to Diop's arguments at the symposion were wide-ranging. French professor Jean Leclant stressed the "African character of Egyptian civilization" but felt it was important to differenciate between 'race' and 'culture' and that there was no reason to rely on "outmoded studies" from Ernest Chantre, Grafton Elliot Smith, Giuseppe Sergi and Douglas Erith Derry as Diop had done. Sudanese professor Abdelgadir M. Abdalla noted that iconographic evidence showed that the "creators of the Napata culture had nothing in common with the Egyptians" and had "completely different" anatomical characteristics. He further argued that Diop's linguistic comparisons between Egyptian and Wolof were "neither convincing nor conclusive" and "it  was  hazardous  to  make  too  uncompromising  a  correlation  between  a  language  and  an  ethnic  structure ". Abdalla's criticism of Diop's arguments lead to a "lively exchange of views on linguistic matters between Professors  Abdalla and Diop". Egyptian professor Abu Bakr argued that "Egyptians had never  been  isolated  from  other  peoples" and "never  constituted  a  pure  race". Congolese professor Theophile Obenga was however more supportive of Diop's views. He argued that "morphological, lexicological and syntactic  similarities" provided "convincing  proof of  the  close  relationship between ancient Egyptian and  negro-African  languages of today" and that this was not the case "between Semitic, Berber and Egyptian". French professor Jean Vercoutter agreed with Diop that "that the populations of the Egyptian reaches of the Nile Valley was homogenous as far as the southern extremity of the Delta" during the proto-dynastic and pre-dynastic periods. Overall, Diop's chapter was credited in the general conclusion of the 1974 symposium report by the International Scientific Committee's Rapporteur, Professor Jean Devisse,  as a "painstakingly researched contribution" which nevertheless lead to a "real lack of balance" in the discussion among participants.

Jan Vansina, who contributed chapters to volumes 1, 3–5, 7 and 8, noted that there had previously been a "clash" between Cheikh Anta Diop and Gamal Mokhtar on the matter of topics that would be included in the second volume. The committee then decided on the "principle of heterogeneity" and that uniformity on the interpretation of historical evidence would not be imposed on any historian writing for the UNESCO General History of Africa.

John Parkington's "Southern Africa" chapter
John Parkington contributed a chapter on hunters and food-gatherers in Southern Africa for the second volume of the UNESCO series. The committee behind the UNESCO series however expressed "serious reservations" on the methods used in the chapter by the author, as these would cause confusion for the reader by presenting them with information on both the Palaeolithic era and contemporary southern Africa at the same time. Parkington was asked to partially alter his text but did not consider it possible. An agreement was therefore reached that the chapter be published in this form but with a note warning the reader of reservations expressed by the committee.

Chapter on the Bantu Expansion
Volume 3 included a chapter on the Bantu expansion written by Samwiri Lwanga-Lunyiigo and Jan Vansina. The editor's note on this chapter explained that the two authors had "different scientific training and divergent opinions", though could agree on "the most  important  questions". There was however one remaining "serious disagreement" on a theory presented by Samwiri Lwanga-Lunyiigo that differs from the opinion of most specialists on the field of the Bantu expansion but this had been retained for inclusion in the volume.

Withdrawn chapter from Volume 3
An unnamed author was asked to write a chapter on the east African coast and supported Neville Chittick's belief that cities on the east African coast were "basically Asian". All but two of the committee members disagreed with this argument and the committee as a whole agreed that Chittick's position did not account for all known archaeological evidence. This chapter was replaced by another written by Fidelis T. Masao and Henry W. Mutoro.

Map in Volume 5
A debate arose over the correct terminology to use for a map to accompany the chapter "The African diaspora in the old and new worlds". Delegates from different countries were sent to UNESCO to argue either for the use of the term "Persian Gulf" or "Arabian Gulf". The debate over this minor point would block the publication of the fifth volume until 1992.

Reception

Volumes 1 and 2

Christopher Ehret reviewed volume 1 for the African Studies Review and described it as an "essential reference book", referring to the first seven chapters as "useful summaries" for non-specialists. Ehret commended the selection of "most contributors in most volumes were scholastically apt choices" across the eight-volume series. However, he noted a number of limitations with the first volume such as the broad focus on historical geography and non-written sources across several chapters. Also, he criticised the over-representation of older, non-African scholars as contributors with some scholars "thwarting Ki-Zerbo's aspirations "to bring the picture up to date",[having] no more to tell us than in the 1950s". Similarly, he criticised the inclusion of speculative, theories of David Dalby into chapters which examine African linguistic classification and the lack of focus on the current developments in the linguistic field.

In his review on the first two volumes for The International Journal of African Historical Studies, Ivor Wilks described the volumes as "handsome" and available at "so modest a price" compared to most other works on similar topics released by major commercial publishers. Wilks further described the series as "a useful monument to the state of African historiography in the 1970s and 1980s", though also noted that it would have to go through a "continuous process of revision" in order to "retain its value as a reliable work of reference". He also stated that the quality of individual chapters "vary considerably", with some chapters showing "an original contribution to the field" while others "make no pretense to be more than surveys". Wilks noted that "probably few of [the chapters] would otherwise have seen the light of day in the regular learned journals". Wilks described Volume 2 as having "less thematic unity" than the first volume, singling out Cheikh Anta Diop's "shrill" chapter on his "idiosyncratic" views of Ancient Egypt and the unusual step of the editor providing a warning to the reader on this particular chapter.

Michael Brett reviewed volume 2 for The Journal of African History, noting that while it would become "a necessary part of the library of anyone interested in the history of Africa as a whole", it would nonetheless "daunt the uninitiated" and "disappoint the specialist". He observed that despite the length of the book there was a problem with "compression" of information, with most chapters being "too short to allow the subject the exposition it deserves". In discussing the chapters on Egypt, which made up a third of the volume, Brett felt that space had been "simply wasted" with some chapters repeating information mentioned earlier in the volume. He also felt that much of the historical context of Ancient Egypt had been "squeezed almost out of existence", partly due to Cheikh Anta Diop's chapter on the 'Origins of the Ancient Egyptians' which was simply a "restatement" of this author's views and the "long résumé of [the 1974 Cairo Symphosium] on the subject" inserted afterwards seemingly as a "corrective to [Diop]'s idosyncratic view". As a result of space being taken up by this debate, the volume lacked any "discussion [...] of pre-dynastic Egypt and the settlement of the Nile valley which made possible the subsequent civilization". Brett further criticized the later chapters on Egypt, such as the one on Hellenistic Egypt which had "virtually no dates" or profile given for the rulers of the Ptolemaic dynasty. Brett did however praise the chapters on Nubia as providing a "satisfying account" of the Egyptian Empire south of Aswan, as well as the kingdoms based at Napata and Meroe.

Brett found fault with the chapters dealing with Aksum, which had a focus that was "resolutely South Arabian Semitic" with "extremely scant attention paid to the Abyssinian region as a whole". He singled out the chapter on the hunters and food-gatherers of Southern Africa, which included a note by the committee stating that they were unhappy with the author relying on recent ethnographic material, far beyond the chronological limits of this volume, to give an idea of what life was like for these people in ancient times. Brett however felt this chapter was a "most readable account" compared to the "rigidly archeological approach" used by other chapters on sub-Saharan Africa.

Adeline Apena reviewed the second volume for the Comparative Civilizations Review as a "major document in African history" and "dismisses the general sense of invalidity that surrounds use of African oral traditions as historical source material for African history". Apena noted the second volume has an emphasis on the relationship between environment, local resources and the growth of civilisations. However, she remained critical of "the Egyptian scholars in this debate who do not seem to accept that the ancient Egyptians were the same as the dark-skinned Sub-Saharans, in spite of the cultural similarities". Apena concluded that "the lower Nile and its Delta are likely to have blended the stocks of peoples that inhabited the region from Libya to Near East and southwards towards Nubia" but scholarly judgements in the second volume were inconclusive due to the obscurity of the period, scarcity of sources and dated sources.

Volume 3
J. E. G. Sutton reviewed Volume 3 for The Journal of African Study, noting that the chapters were of "varying quality and lucidity" but could be used for scholarly reference or education provided that the reader is "patient enough to sift and select" from among the chapters. He further noted that not all authors in the volume had the "breadth of vision and experience" needed for this kind of book, with some possibly receiving "insufficient editorial guidance" or conversely having "suffered excessive interference". Sutton also felt that the dating system used in the series (which avoids the B.C./A.D. system in order to be culturally neutral) would be confusing to most readers and that the overall presentation of the volume was not "sufficiently inviting". Sutton additionally noted that, like Volume 2, this volume was more heavily focused on Northern Africa than Africa further to the South, though there was a "valiant" attempt to draw together information on the continent as a whole in the final chapter and he commended the "obvious and strenuous effort" to include every region of Africa in the discussion.

Volume 4

Volume 5

Volume 6
In a review for The Journal of African Study, E. Ann McDougell stated that this volumed fared well in regards to quality but felt dated and could be considered "state of the art" of African historiography in the years c. 1975-1980, with only a handful of post-1980s publications listed in the bibliography. She did however praise the book for its "genuinely continental" geographical coverage, the "excellent quality" maps and photographs, establishing both "regional [and] world linkages" and the range of "eminent scholars" who are given "sufficient space to cover their commissioned subject matter". She also sympathised with the "logistical and financial problems" of such an ambitious project which made the publication delay inevitable, but this was still "too long" given the range of quality works that historians were producing by the mid-1980s.

Volume 7
Reviewing the abridged edition of volume 7 for The Journal of African Study, Kirstin Mann felt that "none of the [volume]'s goals [are] wholly realized". She noted that while the individual essays may have adequately "summarized the state of knowledge when they were written", they were now out of date and "little debate emerges within them". Mann however welcomed the chapters on North Africa which can "bridge the divide that too often separates scholarship on North and Sub-Saharan Africa" and commended Albert Adu Boahen on the difficult task of editing the volume. She singled out chapters by Ranger, Ibrahim and Ali, Isaacman and Vansina, Chanaiwa, Crowder, Coquery-Vidrovitch, Afigbo and Atieno-Odhaimbo as those that made "lasting contributions" to African historiography but observed that most chapters lacked any "systematic analysis of struggle, conflict and cleavage within African societies" during the period of study. Mann ultimately summarised the volume as "[passionate] and engaged, if dated, unwieldy and uneven" and criticised the abridged edition's lack of notes and "good bibliography".

Volume 8

See also
 The Cambridge History of Africa, published 1975-1986
 African historiography

Notes

References

Bibliography
UNESCO General History of Africa
 
 

Additional Sources
 Schulte Nordholt, Larissa. "From Metropole to Margin in UNESCO's General History of Africa – Documents of Historiographical Decolonization in Paris and Ibadan" History in Africa Volume 46, (2019), pp. 403–412
 
 

History books about Africa
Education in Africa
UNESCO
1980s books
1990s books